Ismaël Béko Fofana (born 8 September 1988) is an Ivorian professional footballer who play as a striker for Alashkert in the Armenian Premier League.

Fofana represented his country at all youth international levels from Under-17 to Under-23.

Club career

Early years
Born in Abidjan, Fofana came through the MimoSifcom academy, before being promoted to the first team of ASEC Mimosas at the age of 16 in 2005. He made his CAF Champions League debut during that year, even scoring once against Egyptian club Zamalek. He again played that competition the following year with the Mimosas, before signing with English side Charlton Athletic, as a result of the cooperation between these two clubs.

Subsequently, Fofana was loaned to Norwegian club Fredrikstad. However, his contract with FFK was terminated in September 2008, after failing to make an impact at the club, scoring only two goals in two seasons.

Fofana then spent some time with French clubs Cherbourg and Saint-Lô, playing in the lower leagues, but without much success. He eventually moved back to his homeland and spent the next two seasons with Séwé Sport.

Shirak
In January 2012, Fofana came to Europe for the second time by joining Armenian club Shirak. He was their leading scorer in the 2012–13 season with 14 goals, despite leaving the club in the middle of the season. In December 2012, Fofana was loaned to Iranian club Zob Ahan. He returned to Shirak the following summer for their qualification matches for the UEFA Champions League. Fofana scored a hat-trick in the first leg of the first qualifying round against Sammarinese champions Tre Penne. He also showed good performances in a second qualifying round tie against Partizan, securing a transfer to the Serbian club after agreement between two clubs.

Partizan
On 6 August 2013, it was announced that Fofana signed a four-year contract with Partizan. He was officially presented the following day and was given the number 10 shirt. On 17 August 2013, Fofana made his official debut for the club in a 0–0 away league draw against Radnički Niš. He scored his first competitive goal for Partizan in a 5–1 home league win over Radnički Kragujevac on 25 August 2013.

In the 2015 winter transfer window, Fofana was sent on loan to Chinese club Qingdao Jonoon.

After returning to Partizan from his season-long loan, Fofana appeared in only one league game, before being released by the club in the summer of 2016.

Čukarički
On 25 June 2016, it was announced that Fofana signed a two-year contract with Čukarički. He made his official debut for the club only five days later, playing the full 90 minutes in a 3–0 home win over Kazakh club Ordabasy in the first leg of the 2016–17 UEFA Europa League first qualifying round. On 21 July 2016, Fofana scored his first goal for Čukarički in a 1–1 home draw with Hungarian club Videoton in the return leg of the Europa League second qualifying round.

Irtysh Pavlodar loan
On 1 March 2017, Fofana joined Irtysh Pavlodar on loan until the end of the 2016/17 season.

Vojvodina
On 30 June 2018, Fofana signed a two-year-deal with Vojvodina. On 18 December 2018 Fofana and Vojvodina reached an agreement to mutually terminate the contract.

Zira
On 28 January 2019, Fofana signed a deal with Zira, leaving in May 2019 at the end of his contract.

International career
Fofana was the top scorer of the Ivorian national under-17 team in their successful qualifying campaign for the 2005 African U-17 Championship, as well as their top scorer in the final tournament. He also played at the 2005 FIFA U-17 World Championship, scoring in their opening match against Italy U17.

In preparation for the 2008 Summer Olympics, Fofana was a member of the Ivorian U23 team at the 2008 Toulon Tournament, scoring the opener against Japan in the third-place match. He then missed in the penalty shoot-out, but Ivory Coast eventually managed to win the bronze medal.

Career statistics

Club

Honours

Club
ASEC Mimosas
 Ligue 1: 2005, 2006
 Coupe de Côte d'Ivoire: 2005

Shirak
 Armenian Cup: 2011–12

Partizan
 Serbian Cup: 2015–16

International
Ivory Coast
 African U-17 Championship Bronze Medal: 2005
 Toulon Tournament Bronze Medal: 2008

References

External links
 
 
 

Living people
1988 births
Footballers from Abidjan
Ivorian footballers
Association football forwards
Eliteserien players
Armenian Premier League players
Championnat National players
China League One players
Persian Gulf Pro League players
Serbian SuperLiga players
Kazakhstan Premier League players
Azerbaijan Premier League players
Expatriate footballers in Armenia
Expatriate footballers in China
Expatriate footballers in France
Expatriate footballers in Iran
Expatriate footballers in Norway
Expatriate footballers in Serbia
Expatriate footballers in Azerbaijan
Expatriate footballers in Kazakhstan
ASEC Mimosas players
Charlton Athletic F.C. players
Fredrikstad FK players
AS Cherbourg Football players
FC Saint-Lô Manche players
Séwé Sport de San-Pédro players
FC Shirak players
Zob Ahan Esfahan F.C. players
FK Partizan players
Qingdao Hainiu F.C. (1990) players
FK Čukarički players
FC Irtysh Pavlodar players
FK Vojvodina players
Zira FK players
FK IMT players
FC Alashkert players
Ivorian expatriate footballers
Ivorian expatriate sportspeople in Armenia
Ivorian expatriate sportspeople in China
Ivorian expatriate sportspeople in France
Ivorian expatriate sportspeople in Norway
Ivorian expatriate sportspeople in Azerbaijan
Ivorian expatriate sportspeople in Kazakhstan
Ivory Coast youth international footballers